Tsagaannuur (white lake) is a sum of Khövsgöl aimag. The area is 5,410 km2. In 2000, Tsagaannuur had a population of 1,317 people, of which most identified themselves as Darkhad. There were 269 inhabitants who identified themselves as Tsaatan ethnicity. The sum center, officially named Gurvansaikhan, is located at the shore of Dood Tsagaan nuur, 279 km north-north-east of Mörön and 1048 km from Ulaanbaatar.

History 

The Tsagaannuur sum was split off from Renchinlkhümbe, Khövsgöl in 1985.

Economy 

In 2004, there were about 8,000 heads of livestock, among them 2,400 goats, 2,100 sheep, 2,300 cattle and yaks, 1,100 horses, 6 camels, and 632 reindeer. Tsagaannuur houses the only commercial fishing enterprise in Mongolia.

According to the statistics provided by the Tsagaan Nuur Sum government on November 13, 2014, in a general assembly with residents of the sum's Xarmai district, the total amount of domestic reindeer in both nearby West Taiga and in East Taiga is 1511.

Notable places 

This sum covers the north-western part of the Darkhad valley, a basin that is considered remote even by Mongolian standards. Both Tsaatan and Darkhad practice shamanism.

References

External links
Nomadicare https://www.youtube.com/watch?v=OTi20-Nojwo

Literature 

M. Nyamaa, Khövsgöl aimgiin lavlakh toli, Ulaanbaatar 2001, p. 193f

Districts of Khövsgöl Province